Australia is home to four professional football codes. This is a comprehensive list of crowd figures for Australian football codes in 2014. It includes several different competitions and matches from Australian rules football, rugby league, rugby union and soccer. Sydney, Melbourne and Brisbane have teams represented in all four codes. Hobart and Darwin are Australia's only capital cities without a professional football team.

Included competitions

National competitions
Several football codes have national (domestic) competitions in Australia, the following are taken into consideration:

The 2014–15 A-League season (A-L)
 2014–15 A-League season
 2014–15 A-League final series
The 2014 Australian Football League season (AFL)
 2014 NAB Challenge
 2014 AFL premiership season
 2014 AFL finals series
The 2014 National Rugby League season (NRL)
 2014 NRL premiership season
 2014 NRL finals series
The 2014 Super Rugby season (SR)
 2014 Super Rugby season
 2014 Super Rugby finals series

Two of these leagues, specifically the NRL and A-League, have one club each in New Zealand, while only five of the fifteen Super Rugby franchises are located in Australia, with the other ten split evenly between New Zealand and South Africa. Attendance figures for non-Australian clubs are not taken into account in the figures on this page.

Other competitions
Other competitions, such as international and representative competitions, included are:

The 2014 AFC Champions League (ACL)
The 2014 State of Origin series (SoO)
The 2014 Rugby Championship (RU Champ)
The 2014 FFA Cup (FFACup)
The 2014 SANFL season

Note: For these competitions, only figures for games that take place in Australia are taken into account.

Non-competition games
Some non-competition matches (such as friendly and exhibition matches) are also included:

Home test matches played by the Australian National Rugby League Team, the Kangaroos, in 2014.
Home matches played by the Australian National Association Football Team, the Socceroos, in 2014.
Home test matches played by the Australian National Rugby Union Team, the Wallabies, in 2014.
NRL All Stars match, in 2014.
City vs Country Origin match, in 2014.
E. J. Whitten Legends Game, celebrity and former player Australian Rules charity exhibition match

Attendances by league
Some codes have multiple competitions, several competitions are compared here.

Only matches and competitions specifically controlled and sanctioned by each league are counted; matches such as inter-club trial matches are not counted.

Attendances by team
Total home attendances for domestic league competitions are listed here.

Teams are listed by competition – tournament and league competitions that are more than one game in length are taken into consideration.
The NSW Waratahs Rugby Union side has only released attendances for two matches. Some matches attendance figures are available from opposition and other sources.

Attendances by match
Attendances for single matches are listed here. Note that not all matches are necessarily included.

Representative competitions

These are matches that are part of a regular representative competition.

Single matches
These are once-off matches, that aren't part of any regular league competition.

Pre season

Finals

Regular season

The NSW Waratahs Rugby Union side has not been releasing attendance for many matches, figures shown are taken from sources like opponents match reports.

Notes

Waratahs results are taken from

See also
2013 Australian football code crowds
Australian rules football attendance records
Sports attendance
List of sports venues in Australia

References

External links
 Official Website of the Australian Football League
 National Rugby League
 A-League Official website
 Asian Champions League Official website

2014 in Australian rugby league
2014 in Australian rugby union
2014 in Australian soccer
2014 in Australian rules football
2014